Beaty Crossroads is an unincorporated community on Sand Mountain in northern DeKalb County, Alabama, United States. It is located within the town limits of Ider at the intersection of Alabama Highway 75 and Alabama Highway 117.

History
It is believed Beaty Crossroads was named after Oliver Beaty, teacher and founder of the nearby Beaty School.

Geography

References

Unincorporated communities in Alabama
Unincorporated communities in DeKalb County, Alabama